HD 156091 is a double star in the southern constellation of Ara. The primary is a sixth magnitude giant star with stronger than normal lines of carbon, nitrogen, and barium in its spectrum. The companion is a 13th magnitude star at an angular separation of 27.4″ along a position angle of 275°, as of 2000.

References

External links
 HR 6408
 Image HD 156091
 CCDM 17192-5942

Ara (constellation)
156091
Double stars
K-type giants
6408
Durchmusterung objects
084731